Taras Karabin (born 29 March 1989, Lviv, Ukrainian SSR, Soviet Union) is a former professional Ukrainian football defender.

Career
Taras Karabin began his football career in the Ukrainian Second League side Karpaty 2, where his first coach was T. Tkatchuk. In the club, he managed to play only 3 matches before moving to Nyva Ternopil during the 2006/2007 season during which he played 11. In the summer of 2007, Taras Karabin moved to Dniester Ovidiopol, where he debuted in the Ukrainian First League and played 18 matches for the club. In the 2008 summer transfer season, Karabin moved to back to his home town to play for Karpaty Lviv.

External links
 Profile on Official Chornomorets Website

1989 births
FC Karpaty-2 Lviv players
FC Nyva Ternopil players
Living people
Ukrainian footballers
Association football defenders
Sportspeople from Lviv